The Parajanov-Vartanov Institute is an American film organization based in Los Angeles, California, that works to study, preserve and promote the legacy of filmmakers Sergei Parajanov and Mikhail Vartanov.

References

External links

 
Hollywood Reporter on Parajanov-Vartanov Institute Awards
Deadline Hollywood on Parajanov-Vartanov Institute's DOC LA film festival
Screen International Screen International on the institute's DocLA festival.
Fipresci.org, FIPRESCI on the institute's retrospective at Busan International Film Festival
The Moscow Times The Moscow Times
LA Weekly The LA Weekly

Film organizations in the United States
Film preservation organizations